Pellegrino Prisciani (1435 – 1518) was an Italian astrologer, architect, historian and humanist scholar. 

He was active as a diplomat, archivist and personal advisor for Leonello d'Este and Borso d'Este, both leading figures of the Italian nobility, marquis and duke of Ferrara. In their service, he took the position of an ambassador in Venice and Rome.

At court, he was especially cherished for his astrological research. His most noticed publication was the history of the d'Este, called Historiae Ferrariensis. Most of his works were not published, but preserverd in various archives of Northern Italy.

A medal showing Pellegrino Prisciano in profile located at the British Museum today.

Writings 

 Historiae Ferrarienses or Annales ferrarienses
 Collectanea
 Ortopasca
 Spectacula

Further reading 

 G. Beroni: La biblioteca estense e la coltura ferrarese ai tempi del duca Ercole I. (1471-–1505). Torino 1903.
 W. L. Gundersheimer: Ferrara. The Style of a Renaissance Despotism. Princeton University Press, 1973.
 Benet Salway: 'The Nature and Genesis of the Peutinger Map'. In: Imago Mundi. Vol. 57, no. 2, pp. 119–135.

References 

1435 births
1518 deaths
Italian astrologers
15th-century Italian diplomats
Christian astrologers
15th-century Italian historians
15th-century Italian architects
Italian Renaissance humanists
16th-century Italian historians